Accident Investigation Board may refer to:

 Accident Investigation Board Denmark, a government agency of Denmark
 Accident Investigation Board of Finland, a government agency of Finland
 Accident Investigation Board Norway, a government agency of Norway
 Swedish Accident Investigation Board, a government agency of Sweden

See also 
 Accident Investigation Bureau (disambiguation)
 Accident Investigation Branch (disambiguation)